Erdos Group (also Inner Mongolia Erdos Group Co., Ltd.) is a Chinese conglomerate valued at approximately 60.8 billion RMB (US$9.5 billion) with interests in cashmere, energy, and metallurgy.

References

External links

Economy of China
Inner Mongolia